MS Oujda was a ferry built by Aalborg Værft AS  in 1974 for Townsend Thoresen.  She sailed under the name Viking Venturer from Southampton to Le Havre then latterly Portsmouth to Cherbourg . She was sold to  P&O European Ferries  and renamed Pride of Hampshire. With the takeover of Townsend Thoresen by P&O and the sinking of the Herald of Free Enterprise in 1987, P&O wanted to drop the Townsend Thoresen name and the ship names associated with the company. She was repainted from her Townsend Thoresen orange and white livery to the new P&O blue and white, the TT logo on her funnel was also replaced by the P&O house flag. Her funnel was also painted P&O navy blue replacing the TT turquoise colour. Townsend Thoresen became P&O European Ferries and in 1989 Viking Venturer became Pride of Hampshire.  She continued to sail under that name until 2002.
She was transferred to the Portsmouth-Cherbourg route in 1994 as a result of larger vessels Pride of Le Havre &  being chartered for the Le Havre route.

In 1986, the ship was taken to Bremerhaven for "jumboisation" , which added an extra deck to the ship, making it appear comparatively top heavy.

She was sold in 2002 after 27 years service on the English Channel. At the time she, was the eldest cross-channel ferry sailing from the United Kingdom.

Her new owner, El Salam Maritime, renamed her the Pride of Al Salam 2 then latterly Oujda sailing between Sète and Nador in her final days with a Panama flag.

She was sold for demolition in India in 2010.

Sister ships
Viking Venturer was one of four sister ships  ordered by Townsend Thoresen.

The other three were:
 - later the Pride of Cherbourg 2, then Mogador and was scrapped in May 2010.
 - later Pride of Cherbourg 1, now Samothraki.
Viking Viscount - later Pride of Winchester, now Vitsentzos Kornaros.

References

Notes

Bibliography

External links
From the scrapyard Oujda (blog)
'Uglyships.wordpress.com' Pride of Hampshire
An account of a Sète - Nador crossing in September 2006

Ferries of the United Kingdom
Ferries of France
Ferries of Egypt
1974 ships